The men's 5000 metres walk event  at the 1987 European Athletics Indoor Championships was held on 21 and 22 February.

Medalists

Results

Heats
First 6 from each heat (Q) and the next 3 fastest (q) qualified for the semifinals.

Final

References

Racewalking at the European Athletics Indoor Championships
5000